The Human Rights Measurement Initiative finds that Maldives is fulfilling 72.0% of what it should be fulfilling for the right to health based on its level of income. When looking at the right to health with respect to children, Maldives achieves 98.0% of what is expected based on its current income. In regards to the right to health amongst the adult population, the country achieves 99.7% of what is expected based on the nation's level of income.  Maldives falls into the "very bad" category when evaluating the right to reproductive health because the nation is fulfilling only 18.2% of what the nation is expected to achieve based on the resources (income) it has available. 

Life expectancy at birth in Maldives was 77 years in 2011.  Infant mortality fell from 34 per 1,000 in 1990 to 15 in 2004.  There is increasing disparity between health in the capital and on the other islands.  There is also a problem of malnutrition. Imported food is expensive. 

On 24 May 2021, Maldives had the world's fastest-growing COVID-19 outbreak, with the highest number of infections per million people over the prior 7 and 14 days, according to data compiled by Bloomberg. Doctors warned that increasing demand for COVID-19 care could hinder their ability to handle other health emergencies in the Maldives.

Preventuve and public health falls within the remit of the Centre for Community Health and Disease Control. 

The Society for Health Education provides sexual and reproductive health information and services to young people.  It is supported by the United Nations Population Fund.

Healthcare
The proportion of health expenditure in the national budget increased from 8.7% in 1998 to 10.9% in 2000. Total expenditure on health in 2001 was $98. Maldives has a universal health insurance scheme, Aasandha.

There are two hospitals in Malé, the Indira Gandhi Memorial Hospital, which is public and the ADK Hospital which is commercial. On all the inhabited atolls there are primary care facilities, and secondary care with beds on the larger islands.  The atoll-based hospitals have trouble getting supplies of medicine:

 Haa Alif Atoll Hospital
  Addu Regional Hospital
 Kulhudhuffushi Regional Hospital
 Shaviyani Atoll Hospital
 Noonu Atoll Hospital
 Ungoofaaru Regional Hospital
 Baa Atoll Hospital
 Lhaviyani Atoll Hospital
 Alif Alif Atoll Hospital
 Alif Dhaalu Atoll Hospital
 Vaavu Atoll Hospital
 Muli Regional Hospital
 Faafu Atoll Hospital
 Dhaalu Atoll Hospital
 Thaa Atoll Hospital
 Gan Regional Hospital
 Gaaf Alif Atoll Hospital
 Thinadhoo Regional Hospital
 Nyaviyani Atoll Hospital
 Hithadhoo Regional Hospital

In 2000 there was a total of 470 hospital beds, a ratio of one bed for each 577 inhabitants.

References